Rysstad is a village in Valle municipality in Agder county, Norway. The village is located along the river Otra in the Setesdal valley. The Norwegian National Road 9 runs through the village.

Rysstad was the administrative centre of the old municipality of Hylestad which existed from 1915 until its dissolution in 1962. Hylestad Church is located in Rysstad. So is a graveyard, Hylestad kyrkjegard.

References

Villages in Agder
Valle, Norway